In 1861, Prussia and the Qing dynasty signed the first Sino-German treaty during the Eulenburg Expedition. West Germany established diplomatic relations with the Republic of China in 1955. After recognizing the People's Republic of China in 1972, the two countries maintain unofficial diplomatic relations.

History

Early years
Since Taiwan opened its ports for foreign trade in mid-19th century, by the Qing dynasty, the last imperial dynasty of China, German trade companies began establishing presence on the island. It was a time when Southern harbor cities such as Dagou (Kaohsiung) and Anping (Tainan) were preferred over their Northern counterparts, Tamsui and Keelung, for trading business.

Following the defeat of the Qing in the First Sino-Japanese War, Taiwan was ceded to the Japanese empire in 1895. The German Empire opened the consulate in the Tamsui River that same year before closing in 1908 by the Imperial Japanese government.

In 1896, the undersecretary of state of the Foreign Office, Hara Takashi, considered turning the new colony into an extension of the Japanese metropole, modeled on the examples of the relationship between Alsace-Lorraine and Germany as well as that between Algeria and France. By contrast Gotō Shinpei held the view that, racially, the Taiwanese were highly dissimilar from the Japanese in the metropole and that for this reason the island of Taiwan had to have a different administrative structure. In 1898, Gotō was appointed head of the civil administration of the colonial government of Taiwan and, as a result, the “laissez-faire” assimilation policy prevailed.

However, the colonial government interests in the German relations did not disappear immediately. One year later, Sakatani Yoshirō, a member of Taiwan Association, proposed to establish a Japanese university in Taiwan, referring to the University of Strasbourg, although it was not met with approval in government circles. Moreover, the first recorded Japanese delegation to Alsace-Lorraine was represented by a civil servant of the Taiwanese colonial government who visited schools and state institutions, such as courts of justice, prisons, and city administration in 1900. Thirty years later, this official, Ishizuka Eizō, became the governor of Taiwan. However, after this visit, no other delegation related to the colonial government in Taiwan was sent to Alsace-Lorraine.

Post-World War II
After the war, Taiwan was reverted to the Republic of China, the regime that had overthrown the Qing 34 years prior, and Germany was placed under Allied occupation. However, with the onset of the Cold War, the Federal Republic of Germany or West Germany initially did not recognize the People's Republic of China primarily because of its hard-line anti-communist foreign policy of the Hallstein Doctrine but still maintained diplomatic relations with the Republic of China which fled to Taiwan in 1949 after they were defeated in the Chinese Civil War.

West Germany formally supported the One-China policy, in hopes of finding Chinese backing of the reunification of Germany. In 1972, West Germany officially established diplomatic contacts with the PRC, although unofficial contacts had been in existence since 1964.

Recent history
In 2020 a diplomatic spat arose between the two countries when the German Foreign Ministry removed the Taiwanese flag from a page describing bilateral relations.

In 2020 Daniela Kluckert voiced her support for stronger relations with Taiwan.

In January 2021 the German government appealed to the Taiwanese government to help persuade Taiwanese semiconductor companies to ramp up production as a global semiconductor shortage was hampering the German economy's recovery from the COVID-19 pandemic. A lack of semiconductors had caused vehicle production lines to be idled leading German Economy Minister Peter Altmaier to personally reach out to Taiwan's economics affairs minister Wang Mei-hua in an attempt to get Taiwanese semiconductor companies to increase their manufacturing capacity. In response Wang Mei-hua sought Germany’s help in securing vaccines against COVID-19.

In July 2021 Germany and Taiwan signed an agreement expanding air traffic between the two countries. Weekly passenger flights were increased from 7 to 12 and cargo flights were increased from three to five with fifth freedom rights.

In July 2021 German Representative in Taiwan Thomas Prinz was awarded Taiwan's Grand Medal of Diplomacy.

In October 2021 a tweet from the Global Times which called for a “final solution to the Taiwan question” was condemned by Frank Müller-Rosentritt of the Free Democratic Party for its similarity to the “final solution to the Jewish question” which resulted in the Holocaust.

In December 2021 the Bundestag passed a resolution calling on the government to expand ties and cooperation with Taiwan.

In October 2022 a Bundestag delegation led by Klaus-Peter Willsch visited Taiwan.

Representative offices

German Institute Taipei

The German Institute holds an annual Oktoberfest celebration.

Taipei Representative Office in the Federal Republic of Germany

See also
 Netherlands-Taiwan relations
 Foreign relations of Taiwan
 Foreign relations of Germany
 Taiwan–European Union relations

References

 
Bilateral relations of Taiwan
Taiwan